Stephen Slesnick (born December 3, 1977) is a former member of the Ohio House of Representatives who represented the 49th District from 2008 to 2016. A Democrat, Slesnick represented portions of Stark County, including Canton and Massillon.

Life and career
A lifelong resident of Canton, Ohio, after graduating from Ohio State University. He also has worked for Morgan Stanley and Octagon.

Ohio House of Representatives
When William J. Healy II resigned from the Ohio House to become Mayor of Canton, nine people, including Slesnick, sought appointment to the seat. However, House Democrats decided to wait for the results of the 2008 primary, where Slesnick was up against four others for the Democratic nomination. He won the nomination with 29.02% of the electorate, and completed the remainder of Healy's term.

In his campaign for his first full term, Slesnick faced Republican Richard Hart. He won the election with 68.6% of the vote. For the 128th General Assembly, Speaker of the House Armond Budish named Slesnick as Chairman of the Agriculture & Development Subcommittee of the House Finance Committee.

In the 2010 cycle, Slesnick ran for reelection against Republican Travis Secrest, and won with 62.89% of the vote. Slesnick won reelection in 2012 with 69.75% over Republican Monique Moore. He won a final term in 2014 with 62% of the vote.

Committee assignments
House Committee on Commerce & Labor
House Committee on Public Utilities
House Committee on State Government

Electoral history

References

Living people
Ohio State University alumni
Members of the Ohio House of Representatives
1977 births
21st-century American politicians